The 1998 MTV Video Music Awards aired live on September 10, 1998, honoring the best music videos from June 17, 1997, to June 12, 1998. The show was hosted by Ben Stiller at Gibson Amphitheatre in Los Angeles.

Madonna was the most successful winner and nominee of the night, winning six awards out of a total nine nominations: five (out of eight) for "Ray of Light", including Video of the Year and Best Female Video, and one for "Frozen" (its only nomination). Other than Madonna, only Will Smith and The Prodigy won multiple awards that night, winning two apiece.

With regard to nominations, the two biggest nominees aside from Madonna were alt-rock band Garbage and rapper Will Smith.  Smith split his nominations between two videos:  "Gettin' Jiggy wit It" (five) and "Just the Two of Us" (one), each of which earned a Moonman.  In contrast, Garbage received all eight nominations for "Push It" but went home completely empty-handed at the end of the night.

The mesh dress that actress Rose McGowan wore to the award show was the subject of much media attention following the awards. The dress went on to become one of the most iconic and controversial outfits in the history of the VMA's.

Background
After four consecutive ceremonies in New York City, and after lobbying from the Los Angeles Sports and Entertainment Commission and the Entertainment Industry Development Corporation, MTV announced on April 9 that the 1998 Video Music Awards would be held in Los Angeles. Nominees were announced at a press conference hosted by Courtney Love, Mayor Richard Riordan, and MTV president Judy McGrath on July 14. Ben Stiller was announced as the host on August 13. The ceremony broadcast was preceded by the 1998 MTV Video Music Awards Opening Act. Hosted by Kurt Loder and Serena Altschul with reports from Chris Connelly, John Norris, and Rebecca Romijn, the broadcast featured red carpet interviews, pre-taped interviews with Madonna and Hole, a preview of the music video for Madonna's "The Power of Good-Bye," and performances from Usher and Barenaked Ladies.

In the weeks before the awards ceremony, MTV "hacked" its own website intentionally and graffitied the words "JF Was Here" across the page, at the same time that the British hacker JF was under investigation by Scotland Yard for the milw0rm hacktivist attacks. Hundreds of pages hosted on MTV.com sported the new JF logo, including one page that read, "JF was here, greets to milw0rm". MTV later confirmed that the alleged JF "hack" was a publicity stunt to promote the appearance of a commentator named Johnny Fame at their upcoming awards show. Many were puzzled by the apparent hack committed by JF since the hacker was "known for relatively high ethical standards."

Performances

Presenters

Pre-show
 Kurt Loder and Serena Altschul – presented the professional categories
 John Norris and Serena Altschul – presented Best Dance Video and Breakthrough Video

Main show
 Andy Dick and the Backstreet Boys – appeared in the opening skit
 Jerry Stiller – made a special appearance during the opening monologue
 Whitney Houston and Mariah Carey – presented Best Male Video
 Chris Rock – appeared in a taped vignette discussing "security measures" at the event
 Rupert Everett and Salma Hayek – presented Best Group Video
 Tyra Banks – introduced Pras, Ol' Dirty Bastard, Mýa, Wyclef Jean and Canibus
 Johnny Gomez and Nick Diamond (from Celebrity Deathmatch) – appeared in vignettes about the Viewer's Choice award
 Sarah Michelle Gellar and Hanson – presented Best New Artist in a Video
 Rob Thomas – introduced Hole
 Chris Tucker and Jackie Chan – presented Best Video from a Film
 Jada Pinkett Smith and Maxwell – presented Best Alternative Video
 Shaquille O'Neal – introduced Master P
 Will Smith and Tatyana Ali – presented Best Female Video
 Mark McGwire and Sammy Sosa – introduced the Backstreet Boys
 Jack Black and Puff Daddy – appeared in a parody skit of FANatic
 Jennifer Love Hewitt and Mase – presented Best Direction in a Video
 Sarah McLachlan and Natalie Imbruglia – introduced the International Viewer's Choice Awards winners
 Tori Amos and Beck – presented Best Rap Video
 Usher – introduced Brandy and Monica
 Steven Tyler, Joe Perry and David Spade – presented Viewer's Choice
 Chuck D – presented the Video Vanguard Award
 Matt Stone and Trey Parker – introduced the Dave Matthews Band
 Jennifer Lopez and Mark Wahlberg – presented Best R&B Video
 Lenny Kravitz and Gwen Stefani – presented Best Rock Video
 Geri Halliwell – presented Video of the Year
 Busta Rhymes and the Flipmode Squad – introduced the Brian Setzer Orchestra

Winners and nominees
Winners are in bold text.

See also
1998 MTV Europe Music Awards

References

External links
 Official MTV site

1998
MTV Video Music Awards
MTV Video Music Awards
1998 in Los Angeles